Tomboy and the Champ is a 1961 American Western film directed by Francis D. Lyon and starring Candy Moore, Ben Johnson, and Jesse White.

Plot
A young girl in Texas is stricken with polio and it is caring for her pet calf that keeps her strong. She enters the calf in the Chicago International Exposition. The calf wins but the girl discovers that her cow will be auctioned off for a slaughterhouse. A good natured meat packer intervenes, and the girl and the calf are reunited.

Cast
 Candy Moore as Tommie Jo Layne
 Ben Johnson as Jim Wilkins
 Jesse White as Windy Skiles
 Jess Kirkpatrick as Parson Dan Webster
 Paul Bernath as Jasper Stockton
 Christine Smith as Sarah Wilkins
 Norman Sherry as Fowler Stockton
 John Carpenter as Fred Anderson
 Larry Hickie as Curly Cone
 Wally Phillips as Hi-Fi Club Announcer
 Ralph Fisher as 4-H Club President
 Rex Allen as Himself
 Casey Tibbs as Himself
 Jerry Naill as Himself

References

External links

1961 films
1960s English-language films
1961 Western (genre) films
Universal Pictures films
American Western (genre) films
1960s American films